NAGC may refer to:

Organizations
 National Association for Gifted Children, an association in the United Kingdom for gifted and talented children, and their parents.
 National Association for Gifted Children, an association in the United States for gifted and talented children, and their parents.
 National Association of Government Contractors, an advocate for policies that benefit America's business community in the government procurement process, and provides programs and events that increase business opportunities for member companies.